Do Mergh (also known as Domerkh, Do Sorkh, Dowmerkh, and Dūmerkh) is a village in Gowharan Rural District, Gowharan District, Bashagard County, Hormozgan Province, Iran. At the 2006 census, its population was 122, in 30 families.

References 

Populated places in Bashagard County